Lola B10/60 is a sports prototype race car, designed, developed, and produced by British manufacturer Lola, and built to LMP1 rules and regulations, in 2010. It was Lola's attempt to compete in the European Le Mans Series, American Le Mans Series, and Intercontinental Le Mans Cup. It was entered by the Rebellion Racing team for the 2010 Le Mans Series season, and Drayson Racing for the 2010 American Le Mans Series season.

Racing history

24 Hours of Le Mans
Three Judd-powered Lola B10/60's were entered in the 2010 24 Hours of Le Mans; one by Drayson Racing, a team also participating in the American Le Mans Series, and two by Rebellion Racing, a team also entered in the Le Mans Series.

None of these three cars were classified at the end of the race.

Awards

American Le Mans Series
Winner at Road America in 2010

European Le Mans Series
3rd in the LMP1 category in 2010 with Rebellion Racing
Champion in the LMP1 category in 2011 with Rebellion Racing

References

External links 
 Lola B10/60 Speedsport-magazine.com

B10/60
Le Mans Prototypes
24 Hours of Le Mans race cars
Sports prototypes